The GTK-Qt Theme Engine is a project allowing GTK to use Qt widget styles. Aimed primarily at KDE users, it uses Qt to draw the widget into an offscreen buffer, then draws a copy of the contents of this buffer onscreen.

See also 
 QGtkStyle
 QtCurve - a simple theme implemented for both GTK and QT

External links 

 GTK-Qt Theme Engine
 GTK-Qt at KDE-Look.org

Freedesktop.org
GTK
Widget toolkits